The Kedon is a river in Magadan Oblast, Russia.

The Kedon is a left tributary of the Omolon, of the Kolyma basin.
The river flows steadily northwards across an uninhabited area of the Kolyma Mountains. The nearest village is Omolon, located upstream of its mouth. The name of the river originated in the Yukaghir language.

Course
The source of the Kedon is in the northern slopes of the Molkaty Range. The river flows in a steady northern direction until its mouth. It heads across mountainous terrain and crosses the Kedon Range, dividing into multiple branches. It is bound by mountains on both sides, with the Kongin Range to the west in its lower course, until it reaches the Omolon floodplain, where there are swamps and lakes and where it is joined by the Burgachan from the right.  high Mt Golaya rises to the right of the final stretch. Shortly thereafter it joins the left bank of the Omolon  from its mouth, near the border of the Chukotka Autonomous Okrug.

See also
List of rivers of Russia

References

External links
Anadyr - Freshwater Ecoregions of the World

Rivers of Magadan Oblast